Zhang Ying (born 9 February 1982) is a Chinese fencer. She competed in the individual sabre event at the 2004 Summer Olympics.

References

1982 births
Living people
Chinese female fencers
Olympic fencers of China
Fencers at the 2004 Summer Olympics
Fencers from Shanghai
Asian Games medalists in fencing
Fencers at the 2002 Asian Games
Fencers at the 2006 Asian Games
Asian Games gold medalists for China
Asian Games silver medalists for China
Medalists at the 2002 Asian Games
Medalists at the 2006 Asian Games
21st-century Chinese women